The 2023 NRL season will be the 116th of professional rugby league in Australia and the 26th season run by the National Rugby League.

Regular season

Round 1 

The Dolphins made their official NRL debut and also recorded their first ever victory.
Both the Manly–Canterbury and Cronulla–Souths games were sellouts.
Tim Sheens coached his 250th game for the Wests Tigers.

Round 2

Round 3 (Multicultural Round)

Round 4

Round 5

Round 6 (Easter Round)

Round 7

Round 8 (ANZAC Round)

Round 9

Round 10 (Magic Round)

Round 11

Round 12 (Indigenous Round)

Round 13

Round 14

Round 15

Round 16

Round 17

Round 18

Round 19

Round 20

Round 21

Round 22

Round 23

Round 24

Round 25

Round 26

Round 27

Stadiums used

References 

2023 NRL season